Princess Marie Louise of Bulgaria (born 13 January 1933, Sofia) is the daughter of Tsar Boris III and Tsaritsa Ioanna and the older sister of Simeon II of Bulgaria. Her baptism in the Bulgarian Orthodox Church caused controversy at the time because her mother had promised to raise her children as Catholics.
After the change in house laws into absolute primogeniture by her brother King Simeon II, Princess Marie Louise became the head of the house of House of Saxe-Coburg and Gotha-Koháry.

Biography
Her godfather was Aleksandar Malinov.

She was enrolled at the Medical Nurse College of the Spanish Red Cross Society, which she graduated with honours.

After the abolition of the monarchy in 1946, Princess Maria Louise left the country with her mother and brother. They first lived in Egypt and then moved to Spain.

Marriage and issue
She married Prince Karl of Leiningen (1927–1990) in a civil ceremony on 14 February 1957 in Amorbach and in a religious ceremony on 20 February 1957 in Cannes.

The couple had two sons:

 Prince Boris of Leiningen (17 April 1960) married firstly Milena Manov on 14 February 1987; divorced 9 July 1994, with issue. He wed secondly Cheryl Ann Riegler 11 September 1999, with issue 
 Prince Hermann Friedrich of Leiningen (16 April 1963) married Deborah Cully 16 May 1987, with issue

Karl and Marie Louise divorced on 4 December 1968.

On 16 November 1969, she married Bronisław Tomasz Andrzej Chrobok (born 27 August 1934 in Katowice, Poland), in Toronto, Canada. Subsequently they lived in New Jersey, United States and have a daughter and a son:

Princess Alexandra-Nadejda of Koháry (born 14 September 1970), married Jorge Champalimaud Raposo de Magalhães (born 16 September 1970, scion of two Portuguese industrial families, grandnephew of António Champalimaud) on 8 September 2001. They have three children.

Prince Pawel Alastair Antoni of Koháry (born 3 May 1972), married Ariana Oliver Mas in 2014. They have two children.

Princess of Koháry
The title "Princess of Koháry" was nominally ceded to Princess Maria-Louise and the descendants of her second marriage, by her brother King Simeon II, on 11 June 2012.

Professional life
Princess Maria-Louise is a member of the Board of Trustees of the American University in Bulgaria.

On 13 May 2012, at the 18th commencement ceremony, Princess Maria-Louise received an honorary doctoral degree in Humane Letters from the American University in Bulgaria.

In 2001, she visited and toured the church of St John of Rila the Wonderworker in Chicago's Portage Park community area.

Titles, styles, honours and awards

Titles
13 January 1933 – 11 June 2012: Her Royal Highness Princess Maria Louisa of Bulgaria, Princess of Saxe-Coburg and Gotha-Koháry, Duchess in Saxony
11 June 2012 – present: Her Royal Highness Princess Maria Louisa of Bulgaria, Princess of Saxe-Coburg and Gotha-Koháry, Duchess in Saxony, The 9th Princess of Koháry

Honours

Dynastic
  House of Saxe-Coburg and Gotha-Koháry: Knight Grand Cross of the Royal Order of Saint Alexander

Foreign
 : Knight Grand Cross of Honour and Devotion of the Order of Malta

Ancestors

References

Marie Louise of Bulgaria, Princess
Living people
Bulgarian princesses
House of Saxe-Coburg and Gotha (Bulgaria)
Nobility from Sofia
Leiningen family
Princesses of Leiningen
Daughters of kings